Diane Katsiaficas (El Paso, Texas, 23 November 1947) is an American visual artist of Greek heritage.  Her work ranges from small journal drawings and paintings to large-scale installations and has been shown throughout the United States and Europe.  She is a professor in the Art Department at the University of Minnesota.

Her work is included in the collection of the Seattle Art Museum.

Her ceramic and wood installation "Neighbors" is in the lobby of East Precinct building of the Seattle Police Department and was part of the discussion around the Capitol Hill Autonomous Zone (CHAZ)'s fate of public art during the Capitol Hill Organized Protest.

Education
In 1968 she received a B.A. degree in Chemistry from Smith College. In 1974 she received an M.A.T. degree in Art Education from the University of Washington, Seattle, followed by an M.F.A. in Painting in 1976.

Exhibitions
Her exhibitions include: 
 "Visualizing the Instincts of Migration": American Center, Alexandria, Egypt, 2001.
 "Migrations": Diana Gallery, Athens, Greece 2002.
 "Hair Stories": MAEP Gallery, Minneapolis Institute of Art, Minneapolis, Minnesota, 2000.
 "An Allegory of Olives": Terracotta Gallery, Thessaloniki, Greece, January 2004 - February 2004.
 "Migrations": Holter Museum of Art, Helena, Montana, January 2005 - April 2005.

Awards
 Fulbright Scholar Award (two time recipient)
 McKnight Research Award, 1996–1999
 McKnight Foundation Interdisciplinary Artist Fellowship, 1999
 McKnight Foundation Visual Artist Fellowship, 1995
 Humanities Institute Fellowship, University of Minnesota, 2002

References

Selected bibliography

Gleason, Norma Catherine. "Exhibitions. Summer Sets." Artweek vol. 13 nº. 29. September 11, 1982. p. 8, illus.
Glowen, Ron. "Exhibitions: The Will to Order." Artweek vol. 11 nº 34. October 18, 1980 p. 16, illus.
Guenther, Bruce. 50 Northwest Artists: A Critical Selection of Painters and Sculptors Working in the Pacific Northwest. San Francisco: Chronicle Books, 1983.
Kangas, Matthew. "Exhibitions Down on the Farm: Environmental Sculpture Invitational" Artweek vol. 12 nº 29. September 12, 1981 p. 3, illus.
Toale, Bernard. The Art of Papermaking. Worcester, Massachusetts: Davis, 1983.

External links 
Official website

University of Minnesota faculty
Living people
American artists
Smith College alumni
University of Washington College of Education alumni
Year of birth missing (living people)
University of Washington School of Art + Art History + Design alumni